Ramon Magsaysay, officially the Municipality of Ramon Magsaysay (Subanen: Benwa Ramon Magsaysay; Chavacano: Municipalidad de Ramon Magsaysay), is a 4th class municipality in the province of Zamboanga del Sur, Philippines. According to the 2020 census, it has a population of 27,280 people.

The municipality was formed on February 13, 1957, out of 23 barrios of the Municipality of Aurora, and was originally called Liargao. It was renamed after Philippine president Ramon Magsaysay who created the municipality by virtue of Executive Order Number 239. Republic Act Number 2788 marked the renaming of Liargao to Ramon Magsaysay on June 19, 1960.

Geography

Barangays
Ramon Magsaysay is politically subdivided into 27 barangays.

Climate

Demographics

Economy

References

External links
 Ramon Magsaysay Profile at PhilAtlas.com
 [ Philippine Standard Geographic Code]
Philippine Census Information

Municipalities of Zamboanga del Sur
Establishments by Philippine executive order